James Ross Callahan (December 19, 1920 – March 27, 1998) was an American football player. 

Born in El Paso, Texas, Callahan attended Wink High School and played college football for Texas Tech and Texas. He was selected by the Detroit Lions in the second round (13th overall pick) of the 1944 NFL Draft. He appeared in nine games for the Lions during the 1946 season.

References

1920 births
1978 deaths
Texas Tech Red Raiders football players
Texas Longhorns football players
Detroit Lions players
Players of American football from El Paso, Texas